Then You Run is an upcoming British-German thriller television miniseries based on the novel You (2014) by Zoran Drvenkar, adapted by Ben Chanan for Sky Max.

Cast
 Leah McNamara as Tara O'Rourke
 Vivian Oparah as Stink
 Yasmin Monet Prince as Ruth
 Isidora Fairhurst as Nessi
 Richard Coyle as Reagan
 Cillian O'Sullivan as Orin
 Francis Magee as Turi
 Darren Cahill as Darian
 Christian Rubeck as the Traveller

Production
In February 2020, it was announced Sky had commissioned an eight-part adaptation of Zoran Drvenkar's novel You penned by Ben Chanan from Kudos (under Banijay UK). Chanan would also serve as executive producer along with Karen Wilson and Katie McAleese for Kudos; Kara Manley and Serena Thompson for Sky Studios; and Derek Ritchie as producer. German company MadeFor boarded the production as a co-producer. The German Motion Picture Fund (GMPF) also provided funding for the project.

The cast were revealed in August 2021, with Leah McNamara set to lead the series alongside Vivian Oparah, Yasmin Monet Prince, and Isidora Fairhurst. Also joining the cast were Richard Coyle, Cillian O'Sullivan, Francis Magee, Darren Cahill, and Christian Rubeck.

Principal photography began in June 2021.

References

External links
 

Upcoming television series
2023 British television series debuts
2023 German television series debuts
British thriller television series
Sky UK original programming
Television shows based on German novels
Television shows set in the Netherlands